360 Carlova is a very large main-belt asteroid. It is classified as a C-type asteroid and is probably composed of carbonaceous material. The asteroid has a convex, roughly ellipsoid shape. The sidereal rotation period is 6.1873 hours with an axis of rotation along the ecliptic coordinates (l, b) =. It was discovered by Auguste Charlois on 11 March 1893 in Nice.

References

External links 
 
 

000360
Discoveries by Auguste Charlois
Named minor planets
000360
000360
18930311